{{DISPLAYTITLE:C19H19N}}
The molecular formula C19H19N (molar mass: 261.36 g/mol, exact mass: 261.1517 u) may refer to:

 Phenindamine (Nolahist, Thephorin)
 Setiptiline, or teciptiline